Mordecai Baldwin Oliver (October 22, 1819 – April 25, 1898) was an attorney and two-term U.S. Representative from Missouri from 1853 to 1857.

Biography 
Born in Anderson County, Kentucky, Oliver attended the common schools and then studied law.
He was admitted to the bar in 1842 and commenced practice in Richmond, Missouri. He served as a prosecuting attorney for the Fifth Judicial Circuit in 1848.

Congress 
Oliver was elected as a Whig to the Thirty-third Congress and reelected as an Opposition Party candidate to the Thirty-fourth Congress (March 4, 1853–March 3, 1857).

Later career 
Oliver was elected as a Unionist Secretary of State of Missouri in 1861.

He resumed the practice of law in St. Louis, Missouri, and served as judge of the criminal court from 1889 to 1893.

Death and burial 
He moved to Springfield, Missouri, where he died April 25, 1898.
He was interred in Hazelwood Cemetery.

References

1819 births
1898 deaths
People from Anderson County, Kentucky
Missouri Oppositionists
Whig Party members of the United States House of Representatives from Missouri
Opposition Party members of the United States House of Representatives from Missouri
Missouri Unionists
Secretaries of State of Missouri
People of Missouri in the American Civil War
19th-century American politicians